Tchidi Chikere  (born October 10, 1975), is a Nigerian movie director who is also a movie producer, scriptwriter, actor, music video director and singer. He has over 100 films and 2 music albums to his credit.

Background and early life 
Chikere is from Amuzi Ahiazu Mbaise in Imo State. He is the last child of his parents. He studied English Language at the University of Calabar. While in the University he began writing movie scripts and was also  part of a three-man music group. On completion of his National Youth Service, he travelled to the UK, and published his first book while there. Chikere went fully into the film industry after graduating from the University.

Personal life 
Chikere has three sons with his first wife, actress Sophia Tchidi Chikere. The marriage ended in 2012. He is currently married to actress Nuella Njubigbo. The traditional wedding ceremony took place on March 29, 2014 in his wife's hometown in Anambra State and the white wedding at the Catholic Church of Transfiguration, VGC, Lagos State on June 9, 2018.

Film 
He directs the talkshow The Pink Room.

Filmography

Movie roles

Movies produced/directed

Music 
In 2007 Chikere launched his first music album, titled Slaps n Kisses. The album was produced by OJB Jezreel and Marvelous Benji and contained features from Rita Dominic, Pat Attah, Marvelous Benji, Jimmy B and OJB Jezreel. His second album was released in the UK.

He directed the video to Kcee's song "Agbomma".

Discography 
 Show Me Heaven
 Love Injection
 Again and Again
 Club Zone 
 Open Streets
 Obelomo

Awards and nominations 
Chikere has won awards for his directing including the Africa Magic Viewers' Choice Awards. At the Africa Movie Academy Awards in 2008 he won Best Comedy for Stronger Than Pain, and his film Beautiful Soul was nominated for Best Screenplay. He was nominated twice in the 2012 Golden Icons Academy Movie Awards, for Best Actor – Diaspora for his role in When Heaven Smiles and for Best Male Act – Diaspora (Viewer’s Choice). He was also nominated for the Best Original Screenplay at the 2013 Nollywood Movies Awards for directing/producing Dumebi.

See also
 List of Nigerian actors
 List of Nigerian film producers
 List of Nigerian film directors

References 

Living people
1975 births
Nigerian film producers
Nigerian film directors
People from Mbaise
Nigerian male film actors
University of Calabar alumni
Actors from Imo State
Nigerian screenwriters
Nigerian music video directors
Igbo actors